Francesco Zizzari (born 31 May 1982) is an Italian footballer who plays as a forward for Sporting Recco.

Career

Early career
Born in La Spezia, Liguria (some reported in Foggia, Apulia) Zizzari started his career in Serie D teams in Lugo, Emilia-Romagna and Brindisi, Apulia. He won the champion of Group H in 2001–02 Serie D. Zizzari then signed by Spezia. he made his league debut for Spezia in 2003–04 Serie C1. Zizzari then spent 3 seasons out on loan in various Serie C1 teams. He made a breakthrough with A.C. Pavia in 2004–05 Serie C1, reaching the finals of promotion playoff. Pavia lost to Mantova in aggregate, 1–6. In August 2007 he was signed by Lucchese. In January 2008, Zizzari returned to La Spezia. In his median Serie B season, he scored twice. The club relegated and bankrupted after the season, thus Zizzari became a free agent.

Ravenna
Zizzari was signed by Ravenna on 7 August 2008. He scored 15 goals in 2008–09 season, the first season since the third tier renamed to Lega Pro Prima Divisione. While his partner, Davis Curiale and Luca Gerbino Polo scored nearly 1 goal per game with 8 goals in half season and 5 goals respectively. Zizzari also scored two goals in the promotion playoff against Padova, losing 2–3 in the first round/semi-finals. However Ravenna decided to sell Zizzari to raise fund in transfer market.

Pescara
Zizzari was signed by fellow third-tier club Pescara in a co-ownership deal for €300,000. Zizzari re-joined former Grosseto teammate Marco Sansovini and former coach Antonello Cuccureddu. However Sansovini secured a place in starting line-up but Zizzari only able to play 11 starts, a reverse compared to 2006–07 season. However Zizzari had a better goal scoring record of 3 goals, 1 goal lesser than Sansovini. That season Massimo Ganci was the team goalscorer of 8 goals. He made substitute appearances in the promotion playoffs. He scored once for the playoff winner. In June 2010 Pescara bought the remain 50% registration rights from Ravenna by submitting a higher bid (just €500) than Ravenna to Lega Pro, a mechanism to decide the ownership when both clubs failed to form an agreement. However Zizzari did not included in the Serie B plan of Pescara.

Reggina
Zizzari was signed by fellow Serie B club Reggina in another co-ownership deal on 16 July 2010, for €400,000, rejoining Ravenna coach Gianluca Atzori. On the same day Emmanuel Cascione also moved from Reggina to Pescara in a co-ownership deal for €440,000. In his median season for Reggina, Zizzari made 20 league appearances but only started half of them. Atzori preferred Emiliano Bonazzoli and Alessio Campagnacci as starting forward. Zizzari scored his only goal near the end of season (round 39) against Varese, a 1–1 draw. Both Varese and Reggina entered the promotion playoff. (along with Padova and Novara) Reggina was paired with Novara and losing to Novara by lower seeding. Eventually Novara won the playoff. Zizzari only played the first leg as the substitute of Bonazzoli. After the arrival of Roberto Breda on 23 June 2011 as new coach, Zizzari also ruled out from 2011–12 Serie B plan of Reggina. Pescara also gave up the remain 50% registration rights of Zizzari to Reggina on 24 June, the deadline of co-ownership market. In the same window, Pescara acquired Cascione for an additional €100,000.

On 23 July 2011 he was signed by third-tier club Siracusa in a 1-year loan. Coached by Andrea Sottil, Siracusa was the first in the winter break. However Zizzari did not found his form and the coach preferred Mohamed Fofana (who never partnered Zizzari in the formation) and Adriano Montalto as starting forwards (or as the only starting centre forward). Zizzari only made 5 starts, either as a centre forward in 4–2–3–1 formation (two times) or one of the two forwards in 4–3–1–2/4–4–2 formation at the very first of 2011–12 season (two times plus against Prato on 27 November when playmaker Mancosu rested).

Lega Pro clubs
On 31 January 2013 Zizzari was signed by Bassano of Lega Pro Seconda Divisione as a free agent. He made 7 substitute appearances for the Veneto club in 2012–13 Lega Pro Seconda Divisione. On 3 September 2013 he was signed by Foggia Calcio in a 1-year contract. The club was admitted to Lega Pro Seconda Divisione from Serie D on 5 August 2013 to fill the vacancies, however, the southern Italian club must finished 8th or above in 2013–14 season in order to avoid relegation back to Serie D due to the merger of Prima Divisione and Seconda Divisione of Lega Pro. On 31 January 2014 Zizzari was released by Foggia. He was signed by fellow fourth-tier club Gavorrano.

Serie D
Zizzari followed Gavorrano to play in 2014–15 Serie D. In July 2015 he was signed by Sestri Levante. In 2016, he was signed by Ponsacco.

Honours
Brindisi
 Serie D (Group H): 2001–02

Grosseto
 Lega Pro Prima Divisione (Group B): 2006–07
 Supercoppa di Lega di Prima Divisione: 2007

References

External links
 Lega Serie B Profile 
 
 Sky Italia Profile 
 Football.it Profile 
 Francesco Zizzari at Footballdatabase

Italian footballers
Serie B players
S.S.D. Città di Brindisi players
Spezia Calcio players
F.C. Pavia players
U.S. Pistoiese 1921 players
F.C. Grosseto S.S.D. players
S.S.D. Lucchese 1905 players
Ravenna F.C. players
Delfino Pescara 1936 players
Reggina 1914 players
U.S. Siracusa players
Bassano Virtus 55 S.T. players
Calcio Foggia 1920 players
U.S. Gavorrano players
Association football forwards
People from La Spezia
1982 births
Living people
Footballers from Liguria
Sportspeople from the Province of La Spezia